X-Factor is the Ukrainian version of The X Factor, a show originating from the United Kingdom. It is a television music talent show for aspiring pop singers drawn from public auditions. Auditions were held in major cities of Ukraine: Dnipro, Lviv, Donetsk, Kharkiv, Kyiv, Poltava, Korosten, Zaporizhzhia, Simferopol, Mykolaiv, Chernivtsi, Uzhhorod, Lutsk, and Rivne.

So far there have been ten winners of the show: Oleksiy Kuznetsov, Viktor Romanchenko, Aida Nikolaychuk, Alexander Poryadinsky, Dmitry Babak, Kostyantyn Bocharov, Sevak Khanagyan, Misha Panchishyn, ZBSband and Elina Ivashchenko.

Series overview
To date, ten seasons have been broadcast, as summarised below.

 Contestant in (or mentor of) "Ihor Kondratuik"
 Contestant in (or mentor of) "Sergei Sosedov" 
 Contestant in (or mentor of) "Seryoga" 
 Contestant in (or mentor of) "Yolka"
 Contestant in (or mentor of) "Irina Dubtsova" 
 Contestant in (or mentor of) "Ivan Dorn"
 Contestant in (or mentor of) "Nino Katamadze"
 Contestant in (or mentor of) "Andriy Hlivnyuk"
 Contestant in (or mentor of) "Andriy Danylko"
 Contestant in (or mentor of) "Konstantin Meladze"
 Contestant in (or mentor of) "Anton Savlepov"
 Contestant in (or mentor of) "Yulia Sanina"
 Contestant in (or mentor of) "Oleg Vinnik"
 Contestant in (or mentor of) "Dmytro Shurov"
 Contestant in (or mentor of) "Anastasia Kamenskykh"
 Contestant in (or mentor of) "Olya Polyakova"

Judges' categories and their contestants
Key:
 Judge
 Guest judge

In each season, each judge is allocated a category to mentor and chooses three acts to progress to the live shows. This table shows, for each season, which category each judge was allocated and which acts he or she put through to the live shows.

 – Winning judge/category. Winners are in bold, eliminated contestants in small font.

Format
The show follows the format of the original British X Factor. Created in 2004 by renowned British music executive and producer Simon Cowell and the production company FremantleMedia, the format has since become an international success. Adapted versions of the show have been shown in over 20 countries worldwide. By now the "X-Factor" format has become one of the most popular singing talent shows in the world, and the winners in each country often go on to be successful recording artists.

"X Factor" (English) - the word idiom: a character trait that has no clear definition and explanation; talent. In the context of the show - "X-Factor" - part of the "star" in person "star " talent.

Auditions
The show's main aim is to find unique singing talent with a bright personality, stage presence and dance skills are also important elements that the judges are looking for. The contestants are divided into four categories: boys, girls, over 25 years old and groups.

Selection of participants is divided into five stages:
 Step 1: Producers' auditions (these auditions pave the way to the next stage with the judges, but they are not broadcast or acknowledged on the show)
 Step 2: Judges' auditions
 Step 3: Bootcamp
 Step 4: Judges' houses
 Step 5: Live shows

Live shows
The finals consist of two shows: during the first each act performs once, or later in the series twice, and the second show is the results show, where the public vote. The judges mentor a category, where they are responsible for three final acts each.

During the first live broadcast each of the contestants perform one song in front of a studio audience and the judges, usually all the contestants sing live to a backing track. Some performances are accompanied by choreography and instruments. After the song, the judges comment on the performance, and often there is some competition between the judges' views. The lines for voting opens immediately after all the contestants have performed. When there are just 4 or 5 acts left, the format changes a little, with two songs performed by each act.  Three acts remain until the grand final where the public vote alone chooses the winner of the series.

Results
Before announcing the results of the previous show, a famous star usually take to the stage and performs.  Afterwards the results, in no particular order, are announced.  The presenter announces who goes through to the follow week, leaving the final bottom two.   These two acts go head to head and have to sing for survival.  The judges then decide, with one vote each, who should go through to the following week and who should be eliminated.  If there is a tie, the result goes to 'dead lock' where the public vote is used again, and the act with the lowest number of votes leaves the show.  The details of the votes are never announced, as this may influence subsequent votes in future weeks.

Later in the series when there are just a few acts left, the judges do not vote, only comment on the performances.  Only the public vote counts in the results shows.

Season 1 (2010-2011)
The first season of Ukrainian X-Factor began on 4 September 2010, presented by Oksana Marchenko. The judges were: showman Ihor Kondratiuk, singer Yolka, rapper Seryoga and music critic Sergei Sosedov. The winner was Oleksiy Kuznetsov (in Ukrainian Олексій Кузнецов) mentored by Yolka with Mariya Rak (in Ukrainian Марія Рак) mentored by Ihor Kondratiuk as runner-up

Contestants
 – Winner
 – Runner-Up
 – Third Place

Position X-Factor

Colour key

Season 2 (2011-2012)
The second season of Ukrainian X-Factor was launched in August 2011 with live broadcasts starting on 22 October 2011. The shows presenter remained Oksana Marchenko. The judges were also the same: showman Ihor Kondratiuk, singer Yolka, rapper Seryoga and music critic Sergei Sosedov. The winner was Viktor Romanchenko (in Ukrainian Віктор Романченко) from Over 25s category mentored by Seyoga with Oleh Kenzov (in Ukrainian Олег Кензов) from Boys category mentored by Ihor Kondratiuk as runner-up. The final was broadcast 31 December 2011 with results announced in the finale on January 1, 2012.

Contestants
 – Winner
 – Runner-up
 – Third Place

Position X-Factor 2

Colour key

Season 3 (2012-2013)

Contestants
 – Winner
 – Runner-up
 – Third Place

Position X-Factor 3

Colour key

Season 4 (2013-2014)

Contestants
 – Winner
 – Runner-up
 – Third Place

Position X-Factor 4

Colour key

Season 5 (2014)

Contestants
 – Winner
 – Runner-up
 – Third Place

Position X-Factor 5

Colour key

Season 6 (2015)

Contestants
 – Winner
 – Runner-up
 – Third Place

Position X-Factor 6

Colour key

Season 7 (2016)

Contestants
 – Winner
 – Runner-up
 – Third Place

Position X-Factor 7

Colour key

Season 8 (2017)

Contestants
 – Winner
 – Runner-up
 – Third Place

Position X-Factor 8

Colour key

Season 9 (2018)

Contestants
 – Winner
 – Runner-up
 – Third place

Position X-Factor 9

Colour key

Season 10 (2019)

Contestants
 – Winner
 – Runner-up
 – Third place

Position X-Factor 10

Colour key

References

External links
 STB Official Site (Ukrainian)
 No official blog X Factor (Ukrainian)
 Fan Site X Factor (Ukrainian)
 Club X Factor (Ukrainian)

2010s Ukrainian television series debuts
Ukraine
STB (TV channel) original programming